Rixensart is a municipality of Wallonia located in the Belgian province of Walloon Brabant. On January 1, 2018, Rixensart had a total population of 22,401. The total area is 17.54 km² which gives a population density of 1,277 inhabitants per km².

The municipality consists of the following former municipalities, now districts: Rixensart, Rosières, and Genval.  Genval-les-Bains is a local beauty spot, a 100-year-old lake with a fountain, and framed by trees, houses and restaurants. Rixensart is home to the beautiful private-owned Château de Rixensart.

Rixensart is served by two railway stations (at Rixensart and at Genval), connecting it with Brussels to the north and Louvain-la-Neuve to the south. The new arrival of the Brussels RER, will improve both train stations and upgrade the number of trains going from Brussels to Namur to 4 per hour. This will also bring more people to the municipality to live. The municipality is now classified as a commuter town due to its proximity to Brussels, the RER and the E411 Motorway.

Localities
 Lake Genval
 Bourgeois is a village located above the valley of the Lasne. It has a church and several small schools.
 Maubroux is a village has a number of small shops, a church and is located near Genval railway station.
 Le Patch
 Froidmont is an old farmhouse, which was until 2010 was a Dominican convent and was garrisoned during the Battle of Waterloo
 Le Glain is a village with a grammar school and a library.
 Genval is a village

Sports
Rixensart is home to Royale Union Rixensartoise football club, founded in 2008 from the merger of three teams.
Swimming Club Rixensart is a swimming club.
Since September 2017, Rixensart also has his Ultimate Frisbee Team which shows great results in national divisions, trusting the first division in the last years.

Twin towns
Rixensart is twinned with:
 Birstall, Leicestershire, England
 Le Touquet, France
 Winterberg, Germany

Gallery

See also
 Recherche et Industrie Thérapeutiques (RIT)

References

External links
 

 
Municipalities of Walloon Brabant